The Arch of the New Gate, is a Baroque and Neoclassical arch, designed by André Soares in the late 18th century, in the civil parish of Sé, municipality of Braga, in northern Portugal. The triumphal arch which decorates the western entrance to the medieval wall of the city, was opened in 1512 and traditionally used to present the city's keys to dignitaries and celebrities.

History

It was King Ferdinand who eventually completed the wall of city of Braga around 1373, a project begun during the reign of his predecessor King Denis, a project that called for a Torre da Porta Nova (Tower of the New City Gate).
 
Around 1505, and lasting to 1532, archbishop Diogo de Sousa had people working on the construction of the Porta Nova (New Gate). This building project included a phase of rebuilding of the tower, around 1512.

Sometime in the 17th century, Archbishop José de Bragança, ordered the reconstruction of the Porta Nova gate, to include the extension of Rococo decoration. As part of its construction (1772–1773), a statue representing the city of Braga was removed from the Edifício das Arcadas and installed on the arch of the new gate (around in 1772). Followed the following year by the archbishop (Gaspar de Bragança) ordering the transformation of the tower of the Porta Nova, to a triumphal arch in the Baroque style.

The historic arch was used by the municipality, throughout the 20th century, to promotional and marketing campaigns, including the "És de Braga, não fechas as portas" (You're from Braga, do not close your gates) and "Vai abaixo de Braga" (Come under Braga) programs, among others.

Architecture
It is locked within an urban environment, within one of the city's primary arterial roads, in a transitory space between the Campo das Hortas and Rua D. Diogo de Sousa. Its sits between buildings with three to five storey heights, which are mostly commercial shops on the main floor and residences on the upper floors. In the immediate vicinity is a medieval tower, which now houses the Museu de Imagem, the arch representing the principal entrance to the medieval city.

A double decorative composition on either facete, the arch has a Baroque western façade, and an emergente neoclassic eastern façade, highlighting the many faces of the designer André Soares. The western facete, with its interrupted rounded arch façade, is a Baroque arch flanked by four pilasters and crowned by plinths with pyramidal pinnacles. The interrupted curved arch façade is decorated by the coat of arms of archbishop Gaspar of Bragança, above which is the allegorical figure of the city of Braga. The eastern façade, with only two relief pilasters, is surmounted by and image of Nossa Senhora da Nazaré (Our Lady of Nazareth) in a recessed niche.

Notes

Sources
 
 
 

Buildings and structures in Braga
Infrastructure completed in 1773
National monuments in Braga District
Tourist attractions in Braga
Triumphal arches in Portugal
1773 establishments in Portugal